Lirularia dereimsi is a species of sea snail, a marine gastropod mollusk in the family Trochidae.

Description

Distribution
This species occurs in the Atlantic Ocean off São Tomé and Príncipe and off Mauritania and Gambia.

References

 Rubio F. & Rolán E. 1997. Una nueva especie de Lirularia (Gastropoda: Trochidae) de las islas de São Tomé y Príncipe. Iberus 15 (1): 23–29

External links
 Dollfus G.F. (1911). Les coquilles du Quaternaire marin du Sénégal. Mémoires de la Société Géologique de France. 44(3-4) [Paléontologie, 18: 1-72, pls 14-17]

dereimsi
Gastropods described in 1911
Molluscs of the Atlantic Ocean
Invertebrates of West Africa
Invertebrates of São Tomé and Príncipe